Garbancito de la Mancha is a Spanish animated film directed by José María Blay and Arturo Moreno.  Released in 1945, it is the first animated feature film produced in Spain, the first cel-animated feature film produced in Europe, and the first animated feature film produced in color outside of the United States. It is inspired by the story of Don Quijote.

Synopsis
Garbancito is an orphan whose friends, Kiriqui and Chirili, are kidnapped by the giant Caramanca. To rescue his friends, Garbancito is assisted by a goat named Peregrina, his Fairy Godmother, and an enchanted sword.
In 2019 and 2020 8 of the 10 original dufay reels were discovered at two separate yard sales by collector David Bull, who contacted Spain and returned the reels to them at for the small sum of €5,200, which just recovered what he had invested in storage and research.  Asked why he didn't try to sell the priceless reels for a large sum Bull replied "I could not hold a country's cultural heritage hostage".  The original film had been considered lost for all time, with a single film cell in a museum.

See also
Garbancito, the folktale

References

External links
 

1945 animated films
1945 films
Spanish animated films
Films directed by Arturo Moreno (cartoonist)
1940s Spanish-language films
1940s Spanish films